Red Lake is an unincorporated community and census-designated place (CDP) in Coconino County, Arizona, United States. It is bordered to the south by the city of Williams. It was first listed as a CDP prior to the 2020 census.

Demographics

References 

Census-designated places in Coconino County, Arizona